Sam Bennett (born 16 October 1990) is an Irish professional cyclist who rides for UCI WorldTeam . He is a road sprinter who turned professional in 2011. He has won ten Grand Tour stages: three stages in the 2018 Giro d'Italia, two stages at the 2019 Vuelta a España, two stages at the 2020 Tour de France, where he also won the Points classification, one stage at the 2020 Vuelta a España, and two stages at the 2022 Vuelta a España.

Early life 

Bennett was born in 1990 in Wervik, Flanders, Belgium, where his father Michael came in 1989 to play professional football for local club Eendracht Wervik. He moved with his parents to their native Ireland at the age of four, where he spent most of his early years growing up in Carrick-on-Suir, the hometown of fellow cyclist Sean Kelly.

Early career 
Bennett was head-hunted by Vélo-Club La Pomme Marseille at 17, and joined them in the south of France, after completing his first year of third-level education at Waterford Institute of Technology (where he was embarking on an Honours Degree in Health and Exercise Studies). In 2009, Bennett rode, for the first time, the Rás Tailteann with the Carrick Wheelers Dan Morrissey squad. During the 2010 season, Bennett won the under-23 road race at the Irish National Cycling Championships in Sligo, aged 19.

An Post–Sean Kelly (2011–13) 
In 2011, Bennett left France and joined Sean Kelly's  squad, under the tutelage of manager Kurt Bogaerts. He again won the under-23 road race at the Irish National Cycling Championships and also the Grote Prijs Stad Geel, a UCI 1.2 ranked one day race.

The following year he finished tenth in the under-23 road race at the UCI Road World Championships in Limburg, and seventh in the under-23 road race at the UEC European Road Championships.

In 2013  moved up to Professional Continental level; Bennett won two stages in the Rás Tailteann – stage 3 into Listowel and stage 8 in Skerries – and stage 5 of the Tour of Britain, in which he also took two second places.

NetApp–Endura (2014–19)

2014 season 
Having joined  in 2014, Bennett took his first professional win at the UCI 1.1 ranked Clásica de Almería and won twice in Germany: the Rund um Köln and stage 5 of the 1.HC ranked Bayern–Rundfahrt into Nuremberg.

2015 season 
The 2015 season began for Bennett at the Tour of Qatar, where he won the final stage, finishing in the Doha Corniche. Bennett won the first and third stages at the Bayern–Rundfahrt, allowing him to wear his first professional points classification jersey. Bennett was involved in a mass crash at the end of the Scheldeprijs. Bennett began the Tour de France sick, having been diagnosed with a hernia on his diaphragm. He completed 16 stages of the race before abandoning. He returned to racing at the Arctic Race of Norway and won stage 2 into Setermoen; he finished 2nd in the points classification to Alexander Kristoff. Bennett took his final win of the season at Paris–Bourges in a sprint finish.

2016 season 
In March 2016, Bennett won the first stage of the Critérium International in Corsica. Bennett's Tour de France effort was hindered by a crash that resulted in broken fingers on his right hand, but he continued to finish the race last in the general classification – the lanterne rouge – and finishing in the top 10 on the final stage in Paris. After recovering from his Tour injuries, Bennett went on to take a stage win at the Giro di Toscana, and won the points classification. The following month, he won his second consecutive Paris–Bourges.

2017 season 
On 7 March 2017, Bennett won Stage 3 of the Paris–Nice. Bennett went on to win 2 stages of the Tour of Slovenia in June, and won the points classification. At the Czech Cycling Tour, he again won two stages and the points classification jersey. In September, he won the Münsterland Giro in a photo-finish. In October, Bennett won four out of the six stages of the 2017 Tour of Turkey.

2018 & 2019 seasons 
Bennett started the season in the Tour Down Under, despite having an illness. He also started in the Paris–Nice, but had to abandon midway through stage 3 due to sickness. At the Volta a Catalunya, Bennett finished second on stage two. On 11 May 2018, he achieved his maiden Grand Tour stage victory, winning the seventh stage of the Giro d'Italia in Praia a Mare, in a sprint finish. He then added further stage victories on stage 12, finishing at the Autodromo Internazionale Enzo e Dino Ferrari motor racing circuit in Imola, and the final stage into Rome.

In August 2019, he was named in the startlist for the Vuelta a España, his first time competing in the Vuelta a España. On 26 August, he won Stage 3. He also won Stage 14, and finished in second place on four other stages; he finished third in the points classification behind overall contenders Primož Roglič and Tadej Pogačar.

Deceuninck–Quick-Step (2020–21) 
In December 2019, Bennett signed a two-year contract with Belgian team .

2020 season 
He was named in the team to compete in the Tour de France and narrowly finished in second place in a sprint finish on stage 3. On stage 5, Bennett finished in third place and took the green jersey, becoming the first Irish rider to lead one of the classifications in the Tour since Sean Kelly won the same jersey in 1989. On stage 10, Bennett won his first stage in a sprint finish and also regained the green jersey from Peter Sagan, its seven-time winner. Bennett became the sixth Irish cyclist to win a stage at the Tour de France, after Shay Elliott, Kelly, Stephen Roche, Martin Earley and Dan Martin, and the second, after Elliott, to win a stage in every Grand Tour. On 20 September, Bennett won his second stage of the Tour, becoming only the fifth cyclist to win the final stage of the Tour de France while wearing the green jersey, and the second Irish (and the second from the small town of Carrick-on-Suir) cyclist to win the Green Jersey (after Kelly, who won it 4 times, in 1982, 1983, 1985, and 1989).

He won Stage 4 of the Vuelta a España. On stage 9, he crossed the line first but was relegated for a 'shove' in the final kilometre, with the stage win being awarded to Germany's Pascal Ackermann. In the final stage, he again lost out to Ackermann when he was narrowly beaten into 2nd place in the sprint, thus failing by the width of a wheel-rim to achieve a win on the last-day stage of each Grand Tour, after final-day stage wins in the 2018 Giro d'Italia and the 2020 Tour de France.

2021 season 
On 21 June, it was confirmed on that Bennett would miss the Tour de France due to a knee injury.

Bora–Hansgrohe 
In August 2021, Bennett was announced to be rejoining  on a two-year contract, along with his teammate Shane Archbold.

2022 season 
On 28 June, it was confirmed that Bennett would not be part of the Bora–Hansgrohe team that would take part in the Tour de France.

In August Bennett won the second and third stages of the 2022 Vuelta a España in two sprint finishes. He became the second Irish rider to win at least 10 stages in Grand Tours after Sean Kelly.

Career achievements

Major results

2008
 1st  Points race, UEC European Junior Track Championships
 1st  Road race, National Junior Road Championships
 1st Martin Donnelly Junior Tour
2009
 1st Alleins GP
 1st Stage 7 Rás Tailteann
 5th Road race, National Under-23 Road Championships
2010
 1st  Road race, National Under-23 Road Championships
 1st Stage 4 Rhône-Alpes Isère Tour
 7th Grand Prix de Vougy
 8th Dijon–Auxonne–Dijon
2011
 National Road Championships
1st  Under-23 road race
5th Road race
 1st Grote Prijs Stad Geel
2012
 3rd Ronde van Noord-Holland
 7th Road race, UEC European Under-23 Road Championships
 8th Grote Prijs Stad Zottegem
 10th Road race, UCI Under-23 Road World Championships
2013
 1st Overall Suir Valley 3 Day
 Rás Tailteann
1st Stages 3 & 8
 1st Stage 5 Tour of Britain
 4th Schaal Sels
 4th Kernen Omloop Echt-Susteren
 7th Dutch Food Valley Classic
 10th Omloop van het Waasland
2014
 1st Clásica de Almería
 1st Rund um Köln
 Bayern–Rundfahrt
1st  Sprints classification
1st Stage 5
 2nd ProRace Berlin
 5th Scheldeprijs
 6th RideLondon–Surrey Classic
2015
 1st Paris–Bourges
 Bayern–Rundfahrt
1st Stages 1 & 3
 1st Stage 6 Tour of Qatar
 1st Stage 2 Arctic Race of Norway
 2nd Velothon Berlin
 4th Trofeo Playa de Palma
 10th Trofeo Santanyi-SesSalines-Campos
2016
 1st Paris–Bourges
 1st Stage 1 Critérium International
 2nd Trofeo Felanitx-Ses Salines-Campos-Porreres
 3rd Eschborn–Frankfurt – Rund um den Finanzplatz
 4th Trofeo Playa de Palma
 5th Overall Giro di Toscana
1st Points classification
1st Stage 2
 7th Overall Tour of Qatar
 8th Grand Prix de Fourmies
2017
 1st Münsterland Giro
 Tour of Turkey
1st Stages 1, 2, 3 & 5
 Tour of Slovenia
1st  Points classification
1st Stages 1 & 4
 Czech Cycling Tour
1st  Points classification
1st Stages 2 & 4
 1st Stage 3 Paris–Nice
 2nd Down Under Classic
 8th London–Surrey Classic
 10th Grand Prix of Aargau Canton
2018
 1st Rund um Köln
 Giro d'Italia
1st Stages 7, 12 & 21
 Tour of Turkey
1st  Points classification
1st Stages 2, 3 & 6
 7th Eschborn–Frankfurt
2019
 1st  Road race, National Road Championships
 BinckBank Tour
1st  Points classification
1st Stages 1, 2 & 3
 Tour of Turkey
1st  Points classification
1st Stages 1 & 2
 Vuelta a España
1st Stages 3 & 14
Held  after Stages 4–6
 Paris–Nice
1st Stages 3 & 6
 1st Stage 3 Critérium du Dauphiné
 1st Stage 7 UAE Tour
 1st Stage 7 Vuelta a San Juan
 2nd London–Surrey Classic
 6th Road race, UEC European Road Championships
 10th Rund um Köln
2020
 1st Race Torquay
 Tour de France
1st  Points classification
1st Stages 10 & 21
 1st Stage 4 Vuelta a España
 1st Stage 1 Tour Down Under
 1st Stage 3 Tour de Wallonie
 1st Stage 4 Vuelta a Burgos
 8th Scheldeprijs
2021
 1st Classic Brugge–De Panne
 Paris–Nice
1st Stages 1 & 5
 UAE Tour
1st Stages 4 & 6
 Volta ao Algarve
1st  Points classification
1st Stages 1 & 3
 2nd Scheldeprijs
2022
 1st Eschborn–Frankfurt
 Vuelta a España
1st Stages 2 & 3
Held  after Stages 2–7
 3rd Paris–Tours
 5th Road race, UEC European Road Championships
 5th Münsterland Giro
 5th Rund um Köln
 5th Ronde van Limburg
2023
 1st Stage 1 Vuelta a San Juan

Grand Tour general classification results timeline

Classics results timeline

References

External links

 
 
 
 
 
 Irish Cycling Q&A
 VC la Pomme

1990 births
Living people
Irish male cyclists
People from Wervik
Irish Tour de France stage winners
Irish Giro d'Italia stage winners
Irish Vuelta a España stage winners
Sportspeople from County Tipperary
Cyclists from West Flanders